Jan van Rijckenborgh (October 16, 1896 – July 17, 1968) was a Dutch-born mystic and founder of the Lectorium Rosicrucianum, a worldwide esoteric Rosicrucian  movement.

Jan van Rijckenborgh was born in Haarlem, Holland, under the name Jan Leene, adopting the name van Rijckenborgh later. With his brother, Zwier Willem Leene, he rejected the teachings of the orthodox Christianity and grew up with in favour of a more mystical approach. Under the influence of Dr. A. H. de Hartogh he read the theosophical works of German mystic Jakob Böhme and in 1924, with Zwier, joined Max Heindel's school of Esoteric Christianity the Rosicrucian Fellowship, eventually becoming the heads of the Dutch branch.

Ultimately even Heindel's approach proved not enough for van Rijckenborgh and his brother, who left the Fellowship in 1935 to found their own Rosicrucian movement, the Lectorium Rosicrucianum. By this time they had made acquaintance with female Dutch mystic Catharose de Petri who became a co-founder of the Lectorium with the brothers.

Ideas
Van Rijckenborgh propounded his own form of Gnostic Christianity based upon the Rosicrucian Manifestos, Johann Valentin Andreae's works The Chymical Wedding of Christian Rosenkreutz and Rei Christianopolotanae Descriptio and his own wide ranging explorations into hermeticism, alchemy, Freemasonry, the Cathars (thanks in part to his collaboration with neo-Cathar historian Antonin Gadal), Christian Gnosticism and other forms of esoteric study. Taking as his central image of the relationship between the Soul and the Body the Rose Cross he argued for the Transfiguration/Gnostic Rebirth of the Soul in Man, thus achieving a transcendence of the dialectic of ordinary life. The Lectorium was founded to study and proselytize these ideas.

Death
Jan van Rijckenborgh died in 1968 and was succeeded by Catharose de Petri as leader of the movement until her death in 1990. The Lectorium Rosicrucianum continues to exist to this day all over the world. Rijckenborgh's books include Dei Gloria Intacta, The Coming New Man and The Egyptian Gnosis.

See also
 Christian Rosenkreutz
 Confessio Fraternitatis
 Fama Fraternitatis

References
Rosicrucians Through the Ages Rozekruis Pers/ Rosycross Press 
Dei Gloria Intacta Jan van Rijckenborgh. Rozekruis Pers/ Rosycross Press

External links
Jan van Rickenborgh: Profile

Christian occultists
Dutch Christian religious leaders
Rosicrucians
1896 births
1968 deaths
20th-century Christian mystics
People from Haarlem